Saath is the debut Hindi/Urdu album from musician Zameer.

Track listing

Music videos
Zameer has released two music videos for Saath:

References

External links
 Zameer Rizvi

2010 albums
Zameer Rizvi albums